The Mohawks of the Bay of Quinte (MBQ) (Mohawk: Kenhtè:ke Kanyen'kehà:ka ) are a Mohawk First Nation within Hastings County, Ontario. They control the Tyendinaga Mohawk Territory, which is a  Mohawk Indian reserve on the Bay of Quinte in southeastern Ontario, Canada, east of Belleville and immediately to the west of Deseronto. They also share Glebe Farm 40B and the Six Nations of the Grand River reserves with other First Nations.

The community takes its name from a variant spelling of Mohawk leader Joseph Brant's traditional Mohawk name, Thayendanegea (standardized spelling Thayentiné:ken), which means 'two pieces of fire wood beside each other'. Officially in the Mohawk language, the community is called Kenhtè:ke, which means "on the bay" (from Mohawk kénhte "bay", which is also the origin of the word "Quinte"). The Cayuga name is Tayęda:ne:gęˀ or Detgayę:da:negęˀ, 'land of two logs'. The nation's band number is 164.

Overview
The territory of the Mohawks of the Bay of Quinte (MBQ), represent one of the largest First Nations territories in Ontario.

Tyendinaga Mohawk Territory has ties to the birthplace of the Great Peacemaker—Dekanahwideh—who was instrumental in the bringing together the Mohawk, Oneida, Onondaga, Cayuga, and Seneca into the Haudenosaunee Confederacy, according to Kayanesenh Paul Williams, a Six Nations lawyer and author.

The traditional land of the MBQ, which was much more vast that the current territory, was based on a variation of the traditional Mohawk name of Joseph Brant—Thayendanegea —which means "two pieces of fire wood beside each other". In the Cayuga language the name is Tayęda:ne:gęˀ or Detgayę:da:negęˀ—"land of two logs". The geographical feature, the bay is kénhte  in the Mohawk language and the community's official Mohawk name is Kenhtè:ke —"on the bay". It was anglicized to "Quinte".

History 
Following the American Revolution, the Mohawk, who were allies of the British Crown, lost their traditional homelands in the Mohawk Valley of what became New York state, when they were forced to cede their lands following the defeat of the British. As compensation for their allegiance, the Crown offered them unsettled land in Upper Canada. A group of Mohawk led by John Deseronto selected the Bay of Quinte because it was said to be the birthplace of Tekanawita, one of the founders of the Iroquois Confederacy in the 12th century. The majority of the Mohawk followed Joseph Brant to the Six Nations of the Grand River First Nation in what has become the province of Ontario.

On May 22, 1784, the group of 20 Mohawk families (between 100 and 125 people) arrived at Tyendinaga. Nine years later, the Tyendinaga tract of land was officially set aside under Crown Treaty 3½, signed on April 1, 1793, by Lieutenant Governor John Graves Simcoe and thereafter known as the 'Simcoe Deed'.

A wave of Loyalists also settled in the Bay of Quinte area, and the government granted many of them land in the Tyendinaga Tract. During the period from 1820 to 1843, the Mohawk lost two-thirds of the treaty lands of the Simcoe Deed. Additional land loss has left the Mohawk with only  in this area today.

The major new settlement for the Mohawk and other Iroquois in Canada was the Six Nations Reserve of the Grand River (where prominent Mohawk leader Joseph Brant struggled with the colonial government for control of the land). In addition, Mohawk and others joined the existing communities of Kahnawake, Kanesatake, Wahta and Akwesasne (the latter four were mostly Mohawk settlements established along the St. Lawrence River during the colonial era prior to the war).

In 1869, the Gradual Enfranchisement Act was passed by the Canadian federal government, establishing elected band councils on First Nations reserves. The first election for the Mohawks of the Bay of Quinte elected council took place in October 1870, where seven chiefs were elected to sit on the council.

Land claims

In 1995 the MBQ filed a claim on an area which covers 923 acres of land surrounding the Tyendinaga Mohawk Territory area, which included most of the land upon which the township of Deseronto has been built. In 2003, the federal government entered into initial land claims negotiations on the Culbertson Tract land claim.

The claim is based on Loyalist settlers allegedly acquiring Mohawk traditional land illegally, during the period from 1820 to 1843, resulting in the loss of the majority of the land from the Simcoe Treaty. As set out in the Royal Proclamation of 1763, the terms and conditions for purchasing land from Mohawk included the requirement of a community vote prior to  sales of any common land to non-Mohawk.  Research and documentation has shown that these terms and conditions may not have been followed at Tyendinaga. The Township created a "Catalogue of Culbertson Tract Land Claim documents collection" in its archives. Chief Don Maracle renewed a call for negotiations to continue in 2011,  following a period of stagnation. A symposium entitled "The Land that Supports our Feet", was held in Deseronto in 2013 which was well-attended.

In June 2013, Justice Rennie of the Federal Court of Canada ruled in Mohawks of the Bay of Quinte v. Canada (Indian Affairs and Northern Development), that expropriation is one of several viable alternatives available to the government under the law.

Long-term Drinking Water Advisories (DWA)

The Mohawk of the Bay of Quinte have been under a Drinking Water Advisory since 2008, "due to fecal, bacterial and algae contaminations". During a drought in the area, many of the groundwater wells—upon which they had depended—went completely dry.

During the COVID-19 pandemic in Canada, supply chains from manufacturers were disrupted, resulting in an increase in the  water main project from about $8.1 million to $18.2 million. In December 2020, the federal government had announced new funding of $16.7 million to "cover the cost of extending the water mains" from the township of Deseronto and the MBQ's own water-treatment plants which will then be able to serve five areas in the Tyendinaga Mohawk Territory.

This funding supports the final phase in the "multi-phase project to improve access to safe drinking water for the  MBQ community. The federal government and the First Nation invested a combined total of $18.2 million towards the project, which will "ultimately lift five long-term drinking water advisories in the community". This final phase has been contracted out to Gordon Barr Limited, who began construction work in December 2020. The new water mains will link the  MBQ's and Deseronto's water treatment plant, thereby connecting "86 existing homes and several of the community's semi-public buildings".
By 2021, there were about 2,200 people living on the Mohawks of the Bay of Quinte reserve with another 3,000 Mohawks living nearby. Of these, there are about 90 families "on a waiting list for affordable housing".

Government
The Tyendinaga Mohawk Council consists of one Chief and four Councillors, chosen during elections every two years, as per the Indian Act. On December 4, 2017, Council adopted a motion 'to approve to adopt the First Nations Election Act [FNEA] regulations for the Tyendinaga Mohawk Territory in 2019', but Council has not officially adopted a custom election code or opted into the FNEA as of December 2018.

Current Council
Chief
 R. Donald Maracle

Councillors
 Carl "Ted" Maracle
Josh Hill
 Stacia Loft
Chris Maracle

Government history 
From the start, the government of the Mohawk community at the Bay of Quinte consisted of a council of chiefs selected following Haudenosaunee democratic tradition. When the Mohawks first came to the Bay of Quinte, they were led by Captain John Deserontyon, and he was then the first leader of the community. Between the time of the landing in 1784 and Captain John's death in 1811, the government consisted of so-called "community chiefs," "war chiefs," and Captain John himself, who was considered the "headman." All functions of government went through Captain John, and as such the finer points of the government structure are unclear, for instance how many chiefs made up the council.

Upon Captain John's death in 1811, there is evidence from external correspondence with other governments that six chiefs may have led the community in the early 1800s. Extant documents from the 1820s and 1830s include signatures from groups of four chiefs, five chiefs, and six chiefs. In 1835, with the conversion of over 60 community members to Methodism and their subsequent exodus to the Grand River, the number of chiefs on the Quinte Mohawk council was reduced by two, resulting in a council size of four, referred to as "the old chiefs," Brant Brant, Powles Claus, Joseph Pinn, and one other.

In 1843, owing to frustration among the community with how the old chiefs were organizing things, as well as complaints of their alcoholism and the poor decision they had made, the community got together to change the government structure. From this point on, the government was composed of four chiefs and four councilmen, who managed administrative needs such as finances and letter-writing, while the chiefs led the community more broadly. A little while after this, the structure was changed again, so that government consisted of two chiefs and two councilmen, who were chosen by "their equals" (i.e. other "warriors"), as well as a secretary and a treasurer. Trish Rae of Tsi Tyónnheht Onkwawén:na refers to this six-person council as the "managing council," and notes that the four old chiefs remained important members of the community, responsible for signing documents, but only two sat on this managing council.

According to research done by Trish Rae, from the 1840s and increasingly through the 1860s, the Superintendent of Indian Affairs played a more active role in nominating candidates to the managing council, which Rae characterizes as meddling. In 1858, Superintendent Thomas Gummersall Anderson named two men as councillors, and the community chose three other men to be on council—resulting in a council of five. The only one of the "old chiefs" on this 1858 council was Powles Claus. The following year, Visiting Superintendent W. R. Bartlett again named two men to council (Powles Claus and Thomas Claus), while three men were elected by the community (Seth W. Hill, John Loft, and William Maracle). Ultimately, the Superintendent called an end to widespread community-internal elections between 1860 and 1870, claiming that "they're a great deal of trouble, and much ill feeling was caused by the intemperance and excitement." Seth W. Hill was removed from council for intemperance in 1860, and replaced at an election by William J. W. Hill. In 1863, John Loft was dismissed from council also due to intemperance, but was not replaced, leaving a council of four. In 1866, the last remaining of the four "old chiefs" Powles Claus died, reducing the council further to three. Historical evidence indicates that the community had selected Seth Powless to replace the old chief, but he was a controversial figure and not accepted by the whole community—some thought he had "made himself" a chief, though historical evidence is inconclusive.

By December 1868, there were three men in the community who could still claim the title of "old chief" (i.e. a chief following the traditional method of selection), Chiefs Thomas Green, Joseph Penn, and Seth Powless. Fearing that the traditional form of governance they represented would be upset by upcoming legislation (the Gradual Enfranchisement Act of 1869 would be the first official imposition of a government structure by Canada on indigenous governments), the three wrote a letter to an Indian Affairs official to implore them to see the value in their traditional ways of governance. In May 1869, the old chiefs wrote another letter alongside others in the community asking to be exempted from the upcoming legislation. The Gradual Enfranchisement Act, passed on June 22, 1869, instituted official band council elections under the jurisdiction of the Canadian Ministry for Indian Affairs. Under the 1869 act, councils were elected by men aged 21 years and older, with one chief and two "secondary chiefs" per 200 people in the community. The term of office under the act was 3 years, though the legislation also allowed "life chiefs" that were in power when the legislation was enacted to remain in their role until death, resignation, or removal by the Governor-General.

In February 1870, Superintendent Bartlett finally offered to name somebody to replace the late Powles Claus, as long as the community elected somebody to replace the late John Loft. However, this never took place. Instead, in October 1870, the first election under the new federal legislation took place. Seven men were elected following the Gradual Enfranchisement Act.

Around this same time, a group of around 200 who did not want to take part in the legislated system gathered to form a traditional council, following the old ways. This group had help from eighteen chiefs from Grand River, and they reported the creation of this traditional council to the Secretary of State. The chiefs named to this council were Chiefs Thomas Green, Joseph Penn, Seth Powless, Cornelius Maracle (unclear whether this is the same man as on the elected council, possibly Turtle clan), James Brant (likely Bear clan), David Powless (likely Wolf clan), John Brant, Simon Hill (likely Bear clan), and Brant Powless (likely the brother of Seth). Critics of this traditional council wrote to the Secretary of State to warn him about what they characterized as a power-grab by Seth Powless, backed by "pagan" "foreigners," and entreating the protection of the government as Christians.

On October 15, 1889, there was again a selection of chiefs in the traditional way. The chief titles were filled as follows:

 Turtle clan titles:
 Tehkarihoken - Joseph I. Brant
 Ayonwatha - vacant
 Sadekariwadeh - vacant
 Wolf clan titles:
 Sahrehowaneh - Charles B. Brant
 Deyonhehgiveh - Jeremiah Hill
 Orenrehgowah - vacant
 Bear clan titles:
 Dehharagereneh - James B. Brant
 Rastawehserondah - David J. Powless
 Sosskoharowaneh - Peter John

This selection was once again done with help from people from Six Nations, and in consultation with women in the community, including Katherine Brant (likely the mother of Joseph I. Brant), Lina Brant, Lucy Sero, Margaret Jo Brant, Cecilia Ann Brant (mother of Jeremiah Hill), Rachel Maracle, and Mary John (sister of Peter John), whose names are listed at the bottom of the declaration affirming the above chiefs. Though many members of the community supported a return to a traditional council, the government of Canada did not allow it.

In 1915, supporters of Thunder Water, a man who was interested in the education of indigenous people, the improvement of women's rights, and a traditional form of governance, ran for council. His supporters were elected, which greatly displeased the Indian Agent, prompting him to write letters complaining about them.

On September 21, 1916, there was another installation of traditional chiefs:

 Turtle clan titles:
 Tehkarihoken - Will Green (substitutes: R. J. Barnhart, Fred Sero)
 Ayonwatha - J. J. Brant (substitute: John W. Maracle)
 Sadekariwadeh - William M. Doreen (substitute: Herbie S. Brant)
 Wolf clan titles:
 Sahrehowaneh - William J. Sero (substitute: Andrew Sero)
 Deyonhehgiveh - Abe Hill (substitute: Peter Doreen)
 Orenrehgowah - Jacob Maracle (substitute: Joe Sero)
 Bear clan titles:
 Dehharagereneh - Solomon J. Brant (substitute: John J. Smart)
 Rastawehserondah - George Hill (substitutes: Johnson Lewis, J. Sero)
 Sosskoharowaneh - P. Buck (substitute: John A. Maracle)

The women who certified this installation included Mrs. K. Hill (most likely Katherine Hill, mother of George Hill), S. B. (possibly a relative of Solomon Brant), and Mrs. Jane D. (most likely Jane Doreen, mother of William Doreen).

In December 1918, the elected council composed of Thunder Water supporters passed a motion abolishing elections, announcing a return to a life chief system. This was rejected by the government of Canada, and the election was to go forward in 1918. Only pro-election candidates were nominated for election, but since that led to only five men being nominated, the nominees were acclaimed into their council positions with no election. In January 1919, the Canadian government wrote a memorandum explaining why they wouldn't allow a return to the hereditary system, explaining that firstly, while the Six Nations and Oneida Nation of the Thames did still operate under the traditional system, they would be brought under the Indian Act system eventually (and they were, in 1924); secondly, the Canadian government felt the traditional system was cumbersome and antiquated, and "includes selection of chiefs by old women in their dotage."

Into January 1919, despite the appointment of a new elected council headed by Josiah Hill, the "Thunder Water council" continued to meet and enact resolutions. They locked the council house doors to what they referred to as the "appointed elected council," and warned the Indian Agent G. M. Campbell that "he is not a governor or ruler of this band of Indians on Tyendinaga Reserve, only a servant to the said band of Indians." Finally, in February 1919 the locks were broken. On the 4th of that month, a general council meeting with the community was held, and the supporters of the Thunder Water council passed a motion empowering Chief Joseph J. Brant to pursue legal action against the Agent-appointed council. Another motion was passed to seek deeds and treaties from Ottawa, including the "Haldimand Deed," "the constitution of the proclamation of Sir William Johnson," and the "Gunshot Treaty" and "other treaties of the Six Nations Indians," as well as to have all expenses paid by the Department for Indian Affairs.

In April 1919, there was another installation of traditional chiefs. The Minister of the Interior was notified of this installation, and advised that there would be no more elections at the Bay of Quinte. The men installed with chief titles were Joseph J. Brant, Wellington Green, Jacob Maracle, Cornelius J. Maracle, William J. Sero, Abram L. Maracle, William Doreen, George Hill, and Solomon J. Brant. The substitutes were James M. Barnhart, Fred Sero, Ambrose Claus, Jacob Maracle, John W. Maracle, Andrew Sero, Johnson Louis, John Sero, and John J. Smart. The recording secretary was Solomon J. Wright. This petition to the Ministry of Indian Affairs included the names of nearly four hundred community members. And yet, elections under the Indian Act system continued. Evidence of continued frustration by Indian Agents indicates that supporters of traditional councils continued to run for and get elected to the elected council.

Elected councils have continued to operate following the Indian Act throughout the 20th and 21st centuries.

Electoral history

2021 Band Council election

2019 Band Council election

2017 Band Council election

2015 Band Council election

2013 election results

List of Tyendinaga Mohawk Councils (1700s-present)

Demographics

Notes

References

Further reading

External links
 Official Tyendinaga Mohawk Territory webpage
 KWE - Mohawk Nation Radio - Tyendinaga - 105.9 FM
 Tsi Tyonnheht Onkawenna Language and Cultural Centre
 First Nations Technical Institute
 Kahniote Tyendinaga Territory Public Library

Communities in Hastings County
First Nations governments in Ontario
Mohawk tribe